The members of the 37th Manitoba Legislature were elected in the Manitoba general election held in September 1999. The legislature sat from November 18, 1999, to May 2, 2003.

The New Democratic Party led by Gary Doer formed the government.

Gary Filmon of the Progressive Conservative Party was Leader of the Opposition. After Filmon's resignation in 2000, Bonnie Mitchelson served as acting party leader until Stuart Murray was elected leader in November 2000.

George Hickes served as speaker for the assembly.

There were four sessions of the 37th Legislature:

Peter Liba was Lieutenant Governor of Manitoba.

Members of the Assembly 
The following members were elected to the assembly in 1999:

Notes:

By-elections 
By-elections were held to replace members for various reasons:

Notes:

References 

Terms of the Manitoba Legislature
1999 establishments in Manitoba
2003 disestablishments in Manitoba